Đại Thành may refer to several rural communes in Vietnam, including:

Đại Thành, Hanoi, a commune of Quốc Oai District
Đại Thành, Hậu Giang, a commune of Ngã Bảy
Đại Thành, Bắc Giang, a commune of Hiệp Hòa District
Đại Thành, Quảng Ninh, a commune of Tiên Yên District
Đại Thành, Nghệ An, a commune of Yên Thành District